Naduiyeh or Nadueeyeh may refer to places in Iran:
 Naduiyeh-ye Miani
 Naduiyeh-ye Olya
 Naduiyeh-ye Sofla